Andrew Howard Eric Eder (born 1964) is foundation dean and emeritus professor of restorative dentistry at the University of Buckingham Dental Institute and honorary consultant in restorative dentistry at Milton Keynes University Hospital, NHS Foundation Trust. He is also Emeritus Professor of Restorative Dentistry and Dental Education at the UCL Eastman Dental Institute.

He co-edited the book Tooth Surface Loss, published by the British Dental Journal in 2000, has contributed to textbooks and authored over 100 articles. Andrew Eder is clinical director at Specialist Dental Care and the London Tooth Wear Centre 
He also served as president of the Royal Society of Medicine's Odontological Section from 2001 to 2002 and the British Society for Restorative Dentistry from 2005 to 2006.

He is the younger brother of The Hon. Sir Bernard Eder, an English lawyer and a former High Court Judge.

Education 
Eder was educated at North Bridge House School and St Paul's School, London. He completed his Bachelor of Dental Surgery from King's College London School of Medicine and Dentistry in 1986 and his masters in conservative dentistry from the UCL Eastman Dental Institute in 1990.

He subsequently achieved the Membership in Restorative Dentistry (MRD) from the Royal Colleges of England and Glasgow in 1994.

Academic career 
Eder has been associated with the UCL Eastman Dental Institute, the postgraduate dental school of University College London, since 1989. In 2002, he was appointed honorary consultant in restorative dentistry at UCLH NHS Foundation Trust and, in 2008, to a chair in restorative dentistry and dental education at the UCL Eastman Dental Institute.

He served as director of continuing professional development at the UCL Eastman Dental Institute from 2002 to 2012, director of education at the UCL Eastman Dental Institute from 2005 to 2012, associate dean for continuing education at the UCL School of Life and Medical Sciences from 2008 to 2012. and Pro-Vice-Provost at UCL from 2013 to 2017.

Eder was elected chair of the membership in Restorative Dentistry Examination at the Royal College of Surgeons of England and Royal College of Physicians and Surgeons of Glasgow in 2016, served as an examiner since 2009. He has also served on the editorial boards of the British Dental Journal from 2005 to 2017 and the European Journal of Prosthodontics and Restorative Dentistry from 1995 to 2014.

In March 2018, he was appointed emeritus professor of restorative dentistry and dental education at the UCL Eastman Dental Institute.

Since 2003, he has been chair of the charitable trust of Alpha Omega, the oldest international dental fraternity. In July 2017, he was elected a trustee of the United Synagogue.

Publications

Books

Textbooks

Recognition 
  UCL Provost's Teaching Award
 Listed in the Who's Who (UK) in 2012
 Listed in Debrett's People of Today 
 Awarded the Certificate of Merit for Services to Global Philanthropy by Alpha Omega International Dental Fraternity

References

External links 
 Andrew Eder Profile on British Society for Restorative Dentistry
 Q&A with Professor Andrew Eder
 My Week Andrew Eder on The Jewish Chronicle

Living people
1964 births
Dental academics
20th-century British medical doctors
21st-century British medical doctors
Alumni of King's College London
People educated at North Bridge House School
People educated at St Paul's School, London
Alumni of the University of London